Felipe Braun Valenzuela (Mexico City, December 3, 1970) is a Chilean actor.

In theater, he starred with Antonia Zegers In My Way (2003), a play directed by Achondo that tells the story of a kidnapping; he also participated in the 2005 revival of Rojas Magallanes, a piece by the same director. In Charly Tango he played Polo, a blind tourist businessman. Braun is also a director and as such he mounted in 2002 Fragments of a farewell letter read by geologists, by Normand Chaurette (presented at the Museum of Natural History with Mariana Loyola and Luciano Cruz-Coke) and Miss Julia, by August Strindberg (Theater Municipal de Santiago, with Ximena Rivas and Cruz-Coke). As a cultural manager, he founded in 2001 with the latter actor the Lastarria 90 Theater, known as L90, a cultural center where a series of theatrical works have been staged and has supported the development of several films through the digital cinema competition .

In 2011, he returned to the theater as the lead in Martin McDonagh's The Pillowman, directed by Willy Semler, in which he plays the role of Katurian, author of ghoulish tales. In 2013, after 11 years, he returned to National Television to star in the soap opera Solamente Julia. Later, he participated in Volver a amar, La Chúcara, El camionero, La colombiana and finally Amar a morir in 2019, the latest TVN telenovela. Likewise, with Amar a Morir he culminated his career in soap operas and officially withdrew on July 14, 2020 during an interview in which he announced the decision.

Filmography

Films 

 10.7: El caso de Monserrat de Amesti (1997, cortometraje de Marco Enríquez-Ominami) 
 Juan Fariña (1999, de Marcelo Ferrari) como Teniente
 Smog (2000, corto de Sebastián Lelio y Marialy Rivas) 
 Monos con navaja (2000, de Stanley Gonczanski) como Mario.
 Azul y blanco (2004, de Sebastián Araya), como Joven Político.
 Se arrienda (2005, de Alberto Fuguet) como Julián Balbo.
 Mi mejor enemigo (2005, de Alex Bowen) como Teniente Riquelme.
 Radio Corazón (2007, de Roberto Artiagoitia) como Cristián Covarrubias.
 Santos (2008, de Nicolás López) como Padre de Arturo.
 Oscuro iluminado (2008, de Miguel Ángel Vidaurre) como Miguel

Telenovelas

References

1970 births
Chilean male television actors
Chilean male film actors
Living people
20th-century Chilean male actors
21st-century Chilean male actors